Cervia is a seaside resort town in the province of Ravenna, Italy. 

Cervia or Cervià may also refer to:

 Cervià de les Garrigues, a village in Catalonia, Spain
 Cervià de Ter, a village in Catalonia, Spain
 Gerontius of Cervia (died 509), a saint and first bishop of Cervia
 Cervia Air Base, an Italian air force station near Cervia
 Cervia gas field, an offshore gas field in the Adriatic Sea
 ST Cervia, a historic steam tug, preserved in Ramsgate, England

See also
 Servia (disambiguation)